Phyllidiella is a genus of sea slugs, dorid nudibranchs, shell-less marine gastropod molluscs in the family Phyllidiidae.

Species
Species in the genus Phyllidiella include:
 Phyllidiella amphitrite Yonow, 2020
 Phyllidiella annulata (Gray, 1853)
 Phyllidiella backeljaui Dominguez, Quintas & Troncoso, 2007
 Phyllidiella cooraburrama Brunckhorst, 1993
 Phyllidiella granulata Brunckhorst, 1993
 Phyllidiella hageni Fahrner & Beck, 2000 
 Phyllidiella lizae Brunckhorst, 1993
 Phyllidiella meandrina (Pruvot-Fol, 1957)
 Phyllidiella molaensis (Meyer, 1977)
 Phyllidiella nigra (van Hasselt, 1824)
 Phyllidiella pustulosa (Cuvier, 1804)
 Phyllidiella rosans (Bergh, 1873)
 Phyllidiella rudmani  Brunckhorst, 1993
 Phyllidiella striata (Bergh, 1889) 
 Phyllidiella zeylanica (Kelaart, 1859)
Species brought into synonymy
 Phyllidiella nobilis (Bergh, 1869): synonym of Phyllidiella pustulosa (Cuvier, 1804) - type species of Phyllidiella.

References

Phyllidiidae